Jabr may refer to:

People
 Jabr (slave), Christian slave
 Jabr Muadi, Druze Arab politician
 Muhammad bin Jabr Al Thani, Qatari politician
 Baqir Jabr al-Zubeidi, Iraqi politician 
 Mujahid ibn Jabr, Tabi‘un
 Rabih Jabr, Lebanese engineer

Other uses
 Habil Jabr District, district of the Lahij Governorate, Yemen
 Jabr-e Joghrafiyaei, Mohsen Namjoo album

Arabic-language surnames
Arabic masculine given names